Antipterna stichoptis is a species of moth in the family Oecophoridae, first described by Oswald Bertram Lower in 1915 as Linosticha stichoptis.   The male holotype for Linosticha stichoptis was collected at Broken Hill in New South Wales, in a Casuarina.

References

Further reading 
 

Oecophorinae
Taxa described in 1915
Taxa named by Oswald Bertram Lower